Lakeysha Hallmon is an American social entrepreneur, businessperson and founder of The Village Market.

Life and education
Hallmon grew up in Batesville, Mississippi. She studied BA from Tougaloo College, MED Curriculum and Instructions from University of Ole Miss, and graduated EdD from Liberty University. She worked as an education and evaluation specialist.

Career
She moved to Atlanta in 2011 and founded The Village Market in April 2016. The Village Market is a tri-annual marketplace and online retail store for Black business owners to showcase their offerings to end users. It also provides educational and entrepreneurial support to Black businesses.

Hallmon also launched Our Village United (OVU), a non-profit organization, in 2017. OUV offers an incubator program called Elevate to support and educate Black business owners for sustainable business development. As of June 2021, the non-profit has helped almost 1,000 Black business owners through its workshops.

References

External link

Year of birth missing (living people)
Living people
American businesspeople
Liberty University alumni